The Kacey Musgraves Christmas Show is a soundtrack album by American country singer Kacey Musgraves, released on November 28, 2019 by MCA Nashville. The album accompanies the Prime Video special of the same name, and is Musgraves' second Christmas album, following 2016's A Very Kacey Christmas.

Reception

Stephen Thomas Erlewine of Allmusic said that the album "builds upon the retro charms of A Very Kacey Christmas, replicating its affectionately tongue-in-cheek blend of old-fashioned show biz corn and seasonal warmth". "Glittery" was praised as a highlight, with Ellen Johnson of Paste calling it "a new romantic holiday staple à la Ella Fitzgerald’s recording of "I've Got My Love To Keep Me Warm," or a much less problematic version of "Baby It's Cold Outside."

Track listing
All songs produced by Ben Winston, Emma Conway, Fulwell 73 Productions, Jason Owen, Kacey Musgraves, and Kyle Ryan.

Personnel
Credits adapted from Tidal

Vocals

Kacey Musgraves – lead vocals, spoken word vocals
Lana Del Rey — lead vocals
Fred Armisen — featured vocals
Leon Bridges — featured vocals
Camila Cabello — featured vocals
James Corden — featured vocals
Zooey Deschanel — featured vocals
Troye Sivan — featured vocals
The Crispy Boys — spoken word vocals, background vocals
Gena Johnson — background vocals
Dan Levy — spoken word vocals
Barbara Musgraves — spoken word vocals
Joe Pisapia — background vocals
Kyle Ryan — background vocals
William D. Sanford — spoken word vocals
Jesse Shapiro — spoken word vocals
Louis Waymouth — spoken word vocals

Musicians

Crystal Brooke Alforque — violin
Emily Cohavi — violin
Matt Endahl — piano
John Estes — upright bass
Adam Keafer — vocal bass
Timothy McKay — baritone saxophone
Scott Quintana — drums, bells, conga, percussion, triangle
Brett Resnick — pedal steel
Kyle Ryan — acoustic guitar, electric guitar, nylon-string guitar, ukulele, piano, toy piano, bells, glockenspiel, mellotron, tambourine, vibraphone
Nat Smith — cello, mellotron, celesta, tenor guitar
Kristin Weber — violin
Kai Welch — trumpet, piano, Wurlitzer electric piano, mellotron, moog bass, organ
Leah Zeger — violin

Technical

Mike Abbott — recording engineer
David Ives — mastering engineer
Gena Johnson — recording engineer, mixing
Rachael Moore — assistant recording engineer
Kyle Ryan — recording engineer, mixing
Darrell Thorp — mixing

Charts

Weekly charts

Year-end charts

Release history

References

2019 Christmas albums
2019 soundtrack albums
Kacey Musgraves albums
Christmas albums by American artists
Country Christmas albums
Folk Christmas albums
Television soundtracks
Soundtracks by American artists